is a passenger railway station in the city of Maebashi, Gunma Prefecture, Japan, operated by East Japan Railway Company (JR East).

Lines
Maebashi-Ōshima Station is served by the Ryōmō Line, and is located 78.1 rail kilometers from the terminus of the line at Oyama Station.

Station layout
The station consists of two opposed side platforms connected by a footbridge. The station has a Midori no Madoguchi ticket office.

Platforms

History
Maebashi-Ōshima Station was opened on 12 March 1991.

Passenger statistics
In fiscal 2019, the station was used by an average of 1627 passengers daily (boarding passengers only).

Surrounding area
East Maebashi Industrial Park
 Amagawa-Ōshima Post Office

See also
 List of railway stations in Japan

References

External links

 JR East Station information 

Railway stations in Gunma Prefecture
Ryōmō Line
Stations of East Japan Railway Company
Railway stations in Japan opened in 1999
Maebashi